The Stöffl Hut is a very old mountain hut at the foot of the Wilder Kaiser in the Austrian state of Tyrol.

Location 
It is an easy stroll from Lake Hinterstein but may also be used as meal stop (Jausenstation) for a range of hiking and climbing tours around the Wilder Kaiser.

History 

The Stöffl Hut was built over 350 years ago on the Walleralm. In summer the local alp is traditionally farmed (for cattle and the production of cheese, etc.); in recent years it has become a focal point for hikers and walkers.

Facilities 

During the summer months the Stöffl Hut is run by the Bichler family from Schwoich and is a popular stop for hikers, walkers and mountain bikers.

References 

Mountain huts in Tyrol (state)
Kaiser Mountains